The Lycée Français Alexandre Dumas de Moscou is the French international school in Krasnoselsky District, Central Administrative Okrug, Moscow, Russia. The school serves levels preschool through terminale, the final year of senior high school.

See also

 France–Russia relations
 Russian schools in France:
 Russian Embassy School in Paris
 Russian Consulate School in Strasbourg

References

External links
   Lycée Français Alexandre Dumas de Moscou
  Association des parents d'élèves non gestionnaires (APENG)
  Association des parents d'élèves non gestionnaires (APENG)

French international schools in Europe
International schools in Moscow
France–Russia relations